Lake George is an unincorporated community in Lincoln Township, Clare County in the U.S. state of Michigan. The ZIP code for Lake George, is 48633 and provides P.O. Box service to an area on the northern side of Lake George. A post office was established on December 8, 1899. As of 2021, the 48633 ZIP Code Tabulation Area had a population of 107.

Lake George was originally founded as a lumber settlement by George Lake. It was a station on the Toledo, Ann Arbor and North Michigan Railway.

Winfield Scott Gerrish is credited with revolutionizing lumbering in Michigan by building a seven-mile-long logging railroad from Lake George to the Muskegon River in Clare County.

The area is mostly wooded land with a variety of wildlife including white-tail deer, wild turkey, pheasant, and other game animals.  Fishing is very popular in the area with numerous lakes (10 within a 10-mile radius) containing largemouth bass, perch, bluegill, sunfish, pike, musky, bullhead catfish, and rock bass.

The population of the area is somewhat mixed. It mainly consists of the original pioneer families and the tourists who stay there during the summer season. There are very few jobs in the area, therefore workers commute to places as far as the Midland area to obtain work.

The town has a large bar (the Swiss Inn), a restaurant and a few small stores; the Lake George Grocery and the new Depot.

There was an old train depot (no longer standing) where two trains crashed on July 19, 1925.

The current "Depot" party store was originally built in 1937 by John Seats Sr. The post office was also inside the grocery store, run by Lula Seats. The store was in the Seats' family until 1973, and three generations of the family worked there.

Images

References

External links

(http://clarecountychamber.com   Clare County Chamber of Commerce
(http://clarecounty.com   Clare County Convention and Visitors Bureau
 Lake George Area History Genealogy Site
 Lake George Local Information Site
 Lake George Boosters Club

Unincorporated communities in Clare County, Michigan
Unincorporated communities in Michigan
Populated places established in 1899
1899 establishments in Michigan